Honda Manufacturing of Alabama (HMA) is an automobile factory located in Lincoln, Alabama.  It builds vehicles for Honda sales in North America.  Production began on November 14, 2001, with the plant producing its two millionth vehicle on September 3, 2010.  HMA is the first Honda factory to have both engine die-casting and machining on site as well as vehicle assembly, under the same roof. HMA is the sole manufacturer of the Honda Odyssey, Honda Passport, Honda Pilot, and Honda Ridgeline.

The first vehicle the factory produced was the Honda Odyssey in 2001.  In 2004 the Honda Pilot was added as the second vehicle the factory was producing.  In 2009 the Alabama factory picked up production of the Honda Ridgeline.  Between 2009-2010 the factory produced the v6 model of the Honda Accord, but all production of the Accord has since moved back to the Marysville Auto Plant.  In 2013 the factory began production of the 2014 Acura MDX until May 2017 when production was moved to Honda's East Liberty Auto Plant.

Vehicles
 Honda Odyssey 1998-present
 Honda Pilot 2003-present
 Honda Ridgeline 2005-present
 Honda Passport 2019-present

Engines

 Honda J engine

Previously Produced Vehicles

 Honda Accord: V6 model only, between 2009-2010
 Honda Ridgeline: 2009-2015
 Acura MDX: 2013-2017

References

Industrial buildings completed in 2001
Honda factories
Motor vehicle assembly plants in Alabama
Buildings and structures in Talladega County, Alabama